Iryna Husieva (born 5 August 1987) is a Ukrainian Paralympic judoka. She represented Ukraine at the 2016 Summer Paralympics held in Rio de Janeiro, Brazil and she won the silver medal in the women's 63 kg event. She also won the silver medal in the women's 63 kg event at the 2020 Summer Paralympics held in Tokyo, Japan.

At the 2015 IBSA European Judo Championships held in Odivelas, Portugal, she won the gold medal in the women's 63 kg event.

References

External links 
 

1987 births
Living people
Ukrainian female judoka
Paralympic judoka of Ukraine
Paralympic silver medalists for Ukraine
Paralympic medalists in judo
Judoka at the 2016 Summer Paralympics
Judoka at the 2020 Summer Paralympics
Medalists at the 2016 Summer Paralympics
Medalists at the 2020 Summer Paralympics
Place of birth missing (living people)
21st-century Ukrainian women